Illing is a surname. Notable people with the surname include:

 Marianne Illing (born 1974), Canadian water polo player
 Peter Illing (1899–1966), Austrian born British film and television actor
 Vivian Illing (1900–2009), at the time of her death in 2009, thought to be the oldest living survivor of the 1906 San Francisco earthquake